Patricio "Pato" O'Ward Junco (born 6 May 1999) is a Mexican professional auto racing driver who competes full-time in the IndyCar Series, driving the No. 5 Chevrolet for Arrow McLaren. He is the 2018 Indy Lights champion.

Early life and career

O'Ward was born in Monterrey, Mexico to Patricio O'Ward and Elba Junco. He attended high school in San Antonio, Texas. He explained on an episode of The Marshall Pruett Podcast that his surname comes from his Irish great-grandfather, adding that he considers himself "full-blown Mexican".

O'Ward began his racing career in karting at the end of 2005 and remained in karting until 2012. During 2013, he competed in open-wheel racing, in Latam Fórmula 2000, Formula Renault 1.6 NEC and Pacific Formula F2000. In 2014, O'Ward competed in French F4 Championship.

In 2015, O'Ward debuted in the Pro Mazda Championship with Team Pelfrey, finishing sixth in the championship. In 2016, O'Ward returned to compete with Team Pelfrey in the Pro Mazda Championship, finishing the season as championship runner-up.

Indy Lights 
In 2018, O'Ward signed with Andretti Autosport to compete in the Indy Lights championship. He won nine of the 17 races, was named Rookie of the Year and won the drivers championship at the penultimate race of the season in Portland, beating runner-up Colton Herta.

IndyCar

IndyCar debut with Harding Racing (2018) 
Two weeks after clinching the 2018 Indy Lights championship title, O'Ward made his IndyCar Series debut at Sonoma Raceway in a second Harding Racing entry, where he qualified fifth and finished ninth. This tied him with David Martínez for the best finish on debut by a Mexican driver in American open-wheel racing.

Part-time drive with Carlin (2019) 
In 2019, O'Ward was scheduled to move up to the IndyCar Series full-time, piloting the No. 8 entry for Harding Steinbrenner Racing. However, sponsorship issues led to O'Ward being granted his release from the team on February 11, 2019.

On March 7, O'Ward joined Carlin on a part-time deal that saw him drive in 13 races in the 2019 season. O'Ward drove Carlin's second entry for 12 races and drove Carlin's third entry for the Indianapolis 500. O'Ward failed to qualify for the Indy 500 along with Carlin teammate Max Chilton and the Carlin-prepared car of McLaren Racing's Fernando Alonso. His Red Bull deal, which was signed in May, also saw him only compete in eight of the 13 events he originally signed for. He placed 26th in the final points standings, with the best race finish of eighth, achieved at the Circuit of the Americas.

On October 30, it was announced that O'Ward had returned to IndyCar by signing a deal with Arrow McLaren SP for the 2020 season.

Arrow McLaren SP (2020–present)

2020 
In his first season for Arrow McLaren SP (AMSP), O'Ward was partnered by Oliver Askew for most races, with Hélio Castroneves replacing Askew at the Harvest GP and with Fernando Alonso in a third entry at the Indianapolis 500. O’Ward had a strong start to 2020, clinching pole position and achieving his first podium finish at the second round of the Road America double-header, finishing second. At Iowa, he finished fourth in the first race. He was fourth in the overall points standings heading into the Indianapolis 500, which was held in August due to the COVID-19 pandemic. O'Ward would go on to finish sixth in his first Indianapolis 500 start and won the Indianapolis 500 Rookie of the Year award for his performance. He subsequently scored consecutive podium finishes in the double-header at World Wide Technology Raceway.

O'Ward was placing as high as third in the driver standings before finishing eleventh and ninth at the double-header at Mid-Ohio and a disappointing 22nd place at the first race of the Harvest GP double-header at Indianapolis Motor Speedway, which dropped him to fifth in the overall standings. After signing a new deal with AMSP, he finished second in the season finale at St. Petersburg, securing fourth in the final championship standings.

2021 
O'Ward's second season with Arrow McLaren SP saw him partner Felix Rosenqvist, previously of Chip Ganassi Racing. O'Ward emerged as a title contender in 2021. He started the season off by earning his second career pole position at the season opener at Barber but was unable to convert that pole position into a win. O'Ward took his first podium of the season with a third-place finish in the first race at the Texas Motor Speedway and took his maiden IndyCar victory in the second race the following day. He became the first Mexican driver to win an IndyCar race since Adrian Fernandez in 2004 at Fontana and the first Chevrolet driver not from Team Penske to win a race since 2016.

After taking his first win, O'Ward never dropped lower than third in the championship standings, consistently fending off series champions Josef Newgarden and Scott Dixon while challenging Álex Palou for much of the season. He started on the pole and finished third at the first race at the Detroit double-header and scored his second win of the season at the second race, his first win on a street course. He achieved his third pole position of the season at the Big Machine Spiked Coolers Grand Prix, where he eventually finished fifth in the race. He achieved another podium with a second-place finish at Gateway, taking the championship lead for the first time in the season. However, a 14th-place finish at Portland by O'Ward saw race-winner Palou retake the lead. At the penultimate race of the season, he clinched a fifth-place finish, remaining second in the points standings heading into the season finale.

At the season finale at Long Beach, O'Ward was one of three drivers who were mathematically in contention for the series title, alongside Palou and Newgarden. To win the title, barring Palou retiring from the race, O'Ward would have to earn the bonus point from qualifying for the pole position, win the race, and hope Palou finished no better than thirteenth to not have a tiebreaker scenario come into play. After a controversial qualifying session where he failed to advance to the Firestone Fast Six and qualified eighth, O'Ward was taken out by Ed Jones early in the race and ultimately retired from the race due to a broken driveshaft, effectively ending his championship hopes. He ultimately finished third in the championship behind Palou and Newgarden. O'Ward secured his first IndyCar track discipline championship when he won the A.J. Foyt Cup as the highest-scoring driver in the series on oval courses in 2021.

2022 

O'Ward would return to Arrow McLaren SP in a contract year. He started the season slowly before capturing his first win of the season and first on a permanent road course at the fourth round at Barber. On May 27, 2022, O'Ward announced he had signed a three-year contract extension with Arrow McLaren SP. O'Ward followed up his new contract with a second-place finish in the 106th Indianapolis 500, briefly nosing ahead of Marcus Ericsson for the lead on the final lap but was unable to complete the pass. After a difficult four race stint that saw him retire with mechanical issues in back to back races O'Ward picked up a second win on the season and first on a short oval at the second round at Iowa. He ultimately finished seventh in the championship standings.

Formula One

Stint with Red Bull Junior Team 

In May 2019, O'Ward was signed to the Red Bull Junior Team and the following month, was placed on a one-event deal to compete at the Red Bull Ring in Formula 2, substituting for the banned Mahaveer Raghunathan, and was announced as Dan Ticktum's replacement in the Super Formula Championship.

Due to a decision by the FIA to award fewer Super License points for O'Ward's Indy Lights championship win, O'Ward was unable to attain the required points to be able to race Formula One in 2020 and would not be retained by Red Bull past 2019. With an IndyCar series ride with McLaren available, Red Bull driver development program head Helmut Marko granted O'Ward an early release from his contract after three Super Formula rounds.

McLaren test 
Before the 2021 IndyCar Series season, McLaren CEO Zak Brown promised O'Ward a test of the McLaren MCL35M if he could win at least one IndyCar race. O'Ward held up his end of the deal with McLaren after winning the XPEL 375 and Brown subsequently confirmed O'Ward would get the promised F1 test. O'Ward got his first opportunity to drive a Formula One Car on November 14, 2021, when he demonstrated a McLaren MP4/13 at Laguna Seca. Two time Formula One World Champion Mika Häkkinen, who drove the MP4/13 to his first Driver's Championship, was on hand to help familiarize O'Ward with the car. During the run, O'Ward beat his fastest lap time around Laguna Seca in the Dallara DW12 with the UAK18 aero kit by over a second with the MP4/13.

On December 14, 2021, O'Ward tested the MCL35M at the end of the season in Abu Dhabi, where he finished fourth-fastest after completing 92 laps. Despite speculation that the test could lead to O'Ward moving up to Formula 1 upon a strong performance, Brown dismissed those rumors by confirming O'Ward would be back with McLaren in IndyCar for the 2022 season, following McLaren's purchase of 75% ownership stake in Schmidt Peterson Motorsports. Brown later stated that the Abu Dhabi test could lead to O'Ward getting additional Formula One tests and even race weekend practice time, if O'Ward adapts to the car and the tires well, but added that O'Ward would have to win the IndyCar Series championship for McLaren to consider moving him from IndyCar to Formula One. In July 2022 Pato was confirmed for additional Formula One tests with McLaren along with late season race weekend practice time being a possibility.

In September 2022, it was announced that O'Ward would carry out another test with McLaren at the Circuit de Barcelona-Catalunya together with Álex Palou. He participated in another test at the Red Bull Ring in October, together with Álex Palou once again.

O'Ward made his free practice debut with McLaren at the 2022 Abu Dhabi Grand Prix.

Sports car racing 
In 2017, O'Ward competed in the WeatherTech SportsCar Championship with Performance Tech Motorsports in the Prototype Challenge (PC) class. O'Ward and his co-drivers won the 24 Hours of Daytona and the 12 Hours of Sebring in the PC class, making him the youngest driver ever to win both races, at 17 years old. He went on to win the 2017 Prototype Challenge drivers championship, alongside James French, and the North American Endurance Cup, alongside French and Kyle Masson.

In 2022, O'Ward participated again in the 24 Hours of Daytona in the LMP2 entry with DragonSpeed, partnered by Colton Herta, Devlin DeFrancesco, and Eric Lux. The team won after an overtake by Herta for first place in the final 11 minutes of the race.

Racing record

Career summary

* Season still in progress.

American open-wheel racing results

Pro Mazda Championship

Indy Lights

IndyCar Series
(key)

* Season still in progress.

Indianapolis 500

Complete IMSA SportsCar Championship results

† Points only counted towards the Michelin Endurance Cup, and not the overall LMP2 Championship.
* Season still in progress.

Complete FIA Formula 2 Championship results
(key) (Races in bold indicate pole position) (Races in italics indicate points for the fastest lap of top ten finishers)

Complete Formula One participations 
(key) (Races in bold indicate pole position) (Races in italics indicate fastest lap)

* Season still in progress.

Complete Super Formula results
(key) (Races in bold indicate pole position) (Races in italics indicate fastest lap)

References

External links
  
 

1999 births
Living people
Mexican racing drivers
Mexican Indianapolis 500 drivers
FIA Formula 2 Championship drivers
Indy Pro 2000 Championship drivers
Indy Lights champions
Indy Lights drivers
IndyCar Series drivers
Indianapolis 500 drivers
Indianapolis 500 Rookies of the Year
WeatherTech SportsCar Championship drivers
24 Hours of Daytona drivers
Mexican people of Irish descent
Team Pelfrey drivers
Andretti Autosport drivers
Harding Steinbrenner Racing drivers
Carlin racing drivers
Mugen Motorsports drivers
MP Motorsport drivers
Arrow McLaren SP drivers
Super Formula drivers
DragonSpeed drivers
French F4 Championship drivers
Auto Sport Academy drivers
NACAM F4 Championship drivers